The Continental Baths was a gay bathhouse in the basement of The Ansonia Hotel in New York City, which was operated from 1968-1976 by Steve Ostrow. It was advertised as reminiscent of "the glory of ancient Rome". 

It opened after Ostorow observed the crowds at Everard Baths and he wanted to improve on the Everard atmosphere of being "sleazy, secretive, unkempt, not to mention unfriendly." Ostorow said “from the first night, there were lines around the corner”   Some patrons said they would have 150 sexual encounters in a single visit.  Opened a year before the Stonewall riots the bath was raided by the police about 200 times, Ostorow said.

While the baths utilized the Ansonia's lavish Gilded Age décor for a Roman style bath, it is probably best remembered as being an influential offbeat music venue.  Ostrow (born September 16, 1932)  was a singer for the New York City Opera.  He installed a stage designed specifically for a DJ, claimed to the first of its type in the world.  Discs were spun by Frankie Knuckles and Larry Levan.

He then began showcasing live acts which were the launching points for Bette Midler, Barry Manilow, Melissa Manchester, Ellen Greene, Labelle, The Manhattan Transfer, Jane Olivor, Wayland Flowers and Peter Allen.  The act most associated with the bath was Midler who was accompanied by Manilow on the piano.  Midler debuted her song Friends at the bath and later recorded an album entitled Bathhouse Betty.  The performances were actually open to the public and not just bath patrons.  The gay crowd dwindled because they didn't like the public in the bath and felt they were being gawked at.  Ostorow cancelled the live performances in 1974 before closing the bath in 1976.

It re-opened as the straight swingers venue Plato's Retreat in 1977.

Facilities 

The features of this bathhouse included a small disco dance floor, a cabaret lounge with a baby grand piano (both only feet from a narrow "Olympia blue" swimming pool), sauna rooms, bunk beds in public areas, and tiny rooms as one would find in any gay bathhouse. The facility had the capacity to serve nearly 1,000 men, 24 hours a day.

One gay guide from the 1970s described the Continental Baths as a place that "revolutionized the bath scene in New York City."

Some features of the Continental Bathhouse included a warning system that tipped off patrons when police arrived. There was a weekly STD clinic, a supply of A200 (a lice-killing shampoo) in the showers, a mouthwash dispenser, and K-Y Jelly in the candy vending machine.

The documentary film Continental by Malcolm Ingram covers the height of the club's popularity through the early 1970s.

Entertainment 
An attraction at the club was the entertainment provided by performers such as Barry Manilow and Bette Midler Due to her performances at the baths, Bette Midler earned the nickname Bathhouse Betty. It was at the Continental, accompanied by house pianist Barry Manilow (who, like the bathhouse patrons, sometimes wore only a white towel) that she created her stage persona the Divine Miss M. 

Despite Midler's constant complaints about "that goddamn waterfall," her poolside performances were so successful that she soon gained national attention, beginning with repeat performances on The Tonight Show Starring Johnny Carson.

Closing 
The Continental Baths lost much of its gay clientele by 1974. The reason for the decline in patronage was, as one gay New Yorker was quoted, "We finally got fed up with those silly-assed, campy shows. All those straight people in our bathhouse made us feel like we were part of the décor and that we were there for their amusement."

By the end of 1974, patronage was so low that Steve Ostrow had decided to discontinue the lounge acts. He focused, instead, on resurrecting his business by making the baths coed. He even advertised on WBLS, but to no avail. In the end, Ostrow closed the Continental Baths for good. The facility, however, was reopened in 1977 as a heterosexual swingers' club called Plato's Retreat. Plato's Retreat relocated to W. 34th St. in 1980 then was shut down by the city of New York at the height of the AIDS epidemic.

Police raids 
In February 1969, the New York City Police raided the Continental Baths. Twenty-two patrons, whom an undercover, towel-clad policeman identified as having offered to have sex with him or actually had sex with him, were arrested. This happened again in December of the same year, when police entered the Continental Baths and arrested three patrons and three employees, charging them with committing lewd and lascivious acts and criminal mischief, respectively.

References

Bibliography 
  (2005 rev. ed. )

External links 
 Continental Baths

1968 establishments in New York City
1968 in LGBT history
Companies established in 1968
1975 disestablishments in New York (state)
Buildings and structures in Manhattan
Gay bathhouses in New York City
LGBT history in New York City